The 1968 Richmond upon Thames Council election took place on 9 May 1968 to elect members of Richmond upon Thames London Borough Council in London, England. The whole council was up for election and the Conservative party stayed in overall control of the council.

Background

Election result

Ward results

References

1968
1968 London Borough council elections